José Maria dos Reis Costa is an East Timorese politician, and a member of the Fretilin political party.

He is the more junior of East Timor's two incumbent Deputy Prime Ministers, and also the incumbent Minister of Planning and Territory, serving since June 2020 in the VIII Constitutional Government of East Timor led by Prime Minister Taur Matan Ruak. 

Previously, he served as a Minister, and as a Secretary of State, in earlier Constitutional Governments.

Early life and career
Reis is a member of a noble family from Bucoli in the Baucau Municipality of East Timor. During the Indonesian occupation of East Timor, he worked as an official in the Indonesian Ministry of Foreign Affairs.

According to Australian journalist and author Jill Jolliffe, Reis's older brother, "... was one of a group of radical students who ... studied in Portugal and [fell] under the influence of Marxist-Leninist ideas. Yet he [was] never ... connected with fanaticism, nor with the ill-treatment of alleged dissidents ... On the contrary, there [are] many stories of his role as a gentle teacher behind guerilla lines, and he ... died a lingering death from untreated wounds ..."

Political career
Reis is a long time member of Fretilin. In 2001, he was elected as a Fretilin candidate to the Constituent Assembly of East Timor, from which the National Parliament emerged in 2002.

On 26 July 2005, as part of a restructure by Prime Minister Mari Alkatiri of the I Constitutional Government in response to tensions within the Fretilin party, Reis was sworn in to one of five new positions in the executive, the key electoral role of Secretary of State for the Coordination of Region I (Lautem, Viqueque and Baucau). He held that office until 8 August 2007.

Reis's house was burned to the ground during the 2006 East Timorese crisis.

On 3 October 2017, Reis was sworn in as Deputy Minister of the Prime Minister for Governance Affairs in the VII Constitutional Government. He remained in that office until the formation of the VIII Constitutional Government on 22 June 2018.

Following a change in the governing coalition, and the admission of Fretilin to the VIII Constitutional Government, Reis was sworn in as Deputy Prime Minister and Minister of Planning and Territory in that government on 24 June 2020.

References

External links 

  – official page of the Deputy Prime Minister

Deputy Prime Ministers of East Timor
Fretilin politicians
Government ministers of East Timor
Living people
Members of the National Parliament (East Timor)

21st-century East Timorese politicians
1956 births